Purwaka Yudhi Pratomo (born 11 April 1984) is an Indonesian professional footballer who plays for PSS Sleman. He plays mainly at defender but can also operate as a defensive midfielder.

International career
In 2007, he played to represent the Indonesia U-23, in 2007 SEA Games.

Honours

Club

Persib Bandung
 Bhayangkara Cup runner-up: 2016

Arema 
 Indonesia Super League: 2009–10
 Indonesia Super League runner-up: 2010–11
 Piala Indonesia runner-up: 2010
 East Java Governor Cup: 2013
 Menpora Cup: 2013
 Indonesian Inter Island Cup: 2014/15

References

External links 
 Purwaka Yudhi at Soccerway
 Purwaka Yudhi on deltras-fc.com

1984 births
Living people
People from Bandar Lampung
Sportspeople from Lampung
Indonesian footballers
Indonesian Premier Division players
Liga 1 (Indonesia) players
Liga 2 (Indonesia) players
Petrokimia Putra players
Deltras F.C. players
Persekabpas Pasuruan players
Arema F.C. players
Persib Bandung players
PSS Sleman players
PSIM Yogyakarta players
Indonesia youth international footballers
Indonesia international footballers
Association football defenders